The Ekottara Āgama (Sanskrit) is an early Indian Buddhist text, of which currently only a Chinese translation is extant (Taishō Tripiṭaka 125). The title Ekottara Āgama literally means "Numbered Discourses," referring to its organizational principle. It is one of the four Āgamas of the Sūtra Piṭaka located in the Chinese Buddhist Canon.

Origins and history 

A complete version of the Ekottara Āgama was translated by Dharmanandi in 384 CE, and edited by Gautama Saṃghadeva in 398 CE. Some believed that it came from the Sarvāstivāda school, but more recently the Mahāsāṃghika branch has been proposed as well. Scholars such as Yin Shun, Zhihua Yao and Tse Fu Kuan consider the Ekottara Āgama to belong to the Mahāsāṃghika school.

According to A.K. Warder, the Ekottara Āgama references 250 Prātimokṣa rules for monks, which agrees only with the Dharmaguptaka Vinaya, which is also located in the Chinese Buddhist canon. He also views some of the doctrine as contradicting tenets of the Mahāsāṃghika school, and states that they agree with Dharmaguptaka views currently known. He therefore concludes that the extant Ekottara Āgama is that of the Dharmaguptaka school.

According to Étienne Lamotte, the Ekottara Āgama was translated from a manuscript that came from northwest India, and contains a great deal of Mahāyāna influence. This may agree with the 5th century Dharmaguptaka monk Buddhayaśas, the translator of the Dharmaguptaka Vinaya and Dīrgha Āgama, who wrote that the Dharmaguptakas had assimilated the Mahāyāna Tripiṭaka (Ch. 大乘三藏). According to Venerable Sheng Yen, the Ekottara Āgama includes teachings of the Six Pāramitās, a central concept in the bodhisattva path, and in the Mahāyāna teachings.

The Ekottara Āgama generally corresponds to the Theravādin Aṅguttara Nikāya, but of the four Āgamas of the Sanskritic Sūtra Piṭaka in the Chinese Buddhist Canon, it is the one which differs most from the Theravādin version. The Ekottara Āgama even contains variants on such standard teachings as the Noble Eightfold Path. According to Keown, "there is considerable disparity between the Pāli and the [Chinese] versions, with more than two-thirds of the sūtras found in one but not the other compilation, which suggests that much of this portion of the Sūtra Piṭaka was not formed until a fairly late date."

Mindfulness of Breathing 

A notable inclusion in the Ekottara Āgama is a discourse that includes meditative instructions on Mindfulness of Breathing given by the Buddha to his son Rāhula. In it, the Buddha gives Rāhula instructions on how he can practice this form of meditation to enter into samādhi. After an unknown length of time, Rāhula enters samādhi, passes through the four stages of dhyāna, and attains complete perfection and liberation. Rāhula then returns to the Buddha as an arhat, giving a full report of his practice, his experiences in meditation, and the realizations that he has had. This discourse corresponds to the Theravadin Maha-Rahulovada Sutta in the Majjhima Nikaya (MN 62).

Influence on East Asia 

In lectures, renowned Buddhist master Nan Huaijin frequently cited the Ekottara Āgama for its discourse on Mindfulness of Breathing, and lectures on Rāhula's report to the Buddha. He detailed the fine points of practice and the relationships that exist between the mind, body, and breath, including related exoteric and esoteric phenomena. Also discussed were the dissemination of this practice into various forms in the Mahāyāna schools of Buddhism in East Asia such as Zen and Tiantai, and into Daoist meditative practices.

See also
 Āgama (Buddhism)
 Anguttara Nikaya
 Anapanasati

References

External links
  Also available from Internet Archive.

Translations of Ekottara Agama 17.1 
 , translated from Taishō Tripiṭaka volume 2, number 125, p. 581b29 - 582c19
  (HTML) Translated from Taishō Tripiṭaka volume 2, number 125, p. 581b29 - 582c19

Translations of MN62, which parallels Ekottara Agama 17.1 
 
 
  (Alternate URL)
 
 
 

Agamas
Tripiṭaka